Sahale Glacier is located on the south slope of Sahale Mountain, North Cascades National Park in the U.S. state of Washington. Sahale is separated by ridges from Davenport Glacier to the northeast and the Quien Sabe Glacier to the north.

See also
List of glaciers in the United States

References

External links

 Aerial photo of Sahale Glacier: PBase

Glaciers of the North Cascades
Glaciers of Chelan County, Washington
Glaciers of Washington (state)